Darrin Walls, Jr. (born June 20, 1988) is an American football cornerback who is currently a free agent. He was signed by the Atlanta Falcons as an undrafted free agent in 2011. He played college football at Notre Dame.

Early years
Walls spent his childhood and adolescence years playing Pop Warner football for the Garfield Gators Youth Football Organization, which has establish a winning tradition throughout the City of Pittsburgh. He attended and graduated from Woodland Hills High School, the same school that produced Jason Taylor. He was a three-sport athlete in football, baseball and track. In football, he played on both sides of the ball. He helped Woodland Hills to WPIAL title as freshman in 2002. He had 53 tackles and six interceptions and also broke up 30 passes, while also rushing for 550 yards and 11 touchdowns, and catching six passes for 230 yards and three scores as a junior. In his final year, he made 22 tackles, had one interception and rushed 29 times for 235 yards and four touchdowns.

In track & field, Walls competed as a sprinter. He qualified for the 2006 PIAA T&F State Championships in the 100-meter dash (10.94 s) and the 200-meter dash (22.51 s), where he took 11th and 7th, respectively. He also coaches sprinting at Baldwin High School.

Professional career

Atlanta Falcons
In 2011, he was signed with the Atlanta Falcons as an undrafted free agent. He played 5 games with the team and had 2 tackles, an interception and defended 2 passes for the 2011 season.

New York Jets
After an injury to Darrelle Revis the New York Jets signed Walls to their practice squad on September 29, 2012. He was promoted to the active roster on November 22, 2012. In 2013, Walls split his time as a starter and reliever with Dee Milliner. During the 2015 season, Walls played in 13 games and collected three tackles, three pass defenses and seven special teams tackles.

Detroit Lions
On March 29, 2016, Walls signed a one-year contract with the Detroit Lions. On September 3, 2016, he was released by the Lions.

Coaching
In 2017, Walls served as the defensive coordinator at Baldwin High School in his hometown of Pittsburgh, Pennsylvania.

Personal life
He is the son of Former NBA and CBA player Darrin Walls Sr.  His father spent time with the Boston Celtics and Houston Rockets in the 1980s before heading to Sacramento to play in the CBA.

References

External links
 
 Atlanta Falcons bio
 Notre Dame Fighting Irish bio

1988 births
Living people
Players of American football from Pittsburgh
American football cornerbacks
Notre Dame Fighting Irish football players
Atlanta Falcons players
New York Jets players
Detroit Lions players